In Memoriam is the 1977 Spanish directorial debut of Enrique Brasó. The film is based on a story by the Argentine writer, Adolfo Bioy Casares. The film explores the thwarted romance between Julio (José Luis Gómez) and Paulina (Geraldine Chaplin). Brasó collaborated with Chaplin again, as a writer in In the City Without Limits (2002) and Oculto (2005). In Memoriam was released in Spain on 2 September 1977.

Plot
In pre-war Madrid, Julio, a shy writer fails to communicate his feelings towards Paulina, the woman he loves. She instead becomes involved with another writer who has no issue with communicating his feelings. A heartbroken Julio leaves Madrid for Cambridge but is shocked at what he discovers when he returns. The shocking truth is that Paulina has been dead for many years, murdered by her lover in a jealous rage after seeing Julio off on his journey to Cambridge.

Cast
Geraldine Chaplin as Paulina Arevalo
José Luis Gómez as Julio Montero
Eduardo Calvo as Senor Segreras
Emilio Fornet

References

External links
 

1977 films
Spanish drama films
Films set in Madrid
1970s Spanish-language films
1970s Spanish films
1977 drama films